Super Pipeline is a puzzle game written by Andy Walker for the Commodore 64 published by Taskset in 1983. The objective is to keep a series of pipes unblocked so that water may flow through them. It was followed by Super Pipeline II by the same author in 1985.

Gameplay
Enemies include saboteurs that plug up the pipes, bugs that fall from the ceiling to kill the player, and a monster that patrols the pipe in later levels. The player is armed with a gun that can kill bugs, saboteurs, as well as the monster (but only from behind), and is followed by a helper that can remove plugs and kill the smaller bugs. In later levels, a series of walls protect the enemies as they climb the ladder on the right towards the roof. A level ends when a set amount of water enters the barrel at the end of the pipe.

Reception
Super Pipeline was placed at number 29 in the first issue of Zzap!64's top 64 games list.

References

1983 video games
Commodore 64 games
Commodore 64-only games
Puzzle video games
Video games developed in the United Kingdom